Kozlovsky District (Kuslavkka rayonĕ) is an administrative and municipal district (raion), one of the twenty-one in the Chuvash Republic, Russia. It is located in the northeast of the republic and borders with the Republic of Tatarstan in the east and southeast, Urmarsky District in the west and southwest, Tsivilsky District in the west, and with Mariinsky District in the northwest. Its administrative center is the town of Kozlovka Population:  The population of Kozlovka accounts for 47.8% of the district's total population.

References

Notes

Sources

Districts of Chuvashia